Vladimir Peralović (Serbian Cyrillic: Владимир Пераловић; born 10 October 1991) is a Serbian football winger who plays for IMT Belgrade.

References

External links
 

1991 births
Living people
Footballers from Belgrade
Serbian footballers
FK Smederevo players
OFK Žarkovo players
FK Zemun players
FK IMT players
FK Kolubara players
FK Proleter Novi Sad players
FK Budućnost Dobanovci players
FK Sloboda Užice players
Serbian SuperLiga players
Serbian First League players
Association football forwards